Hangan is a village in Ye Township in Mawlamyine District in the Mon State of south-east Burma. About 90% of the population is Mon.

References

External links
 Maplandia World Gazetteer

Populated places in Mon State